The 1958 Boston Red Sox season was the 58th season in the franchise's Major League Baseball history. The Red Sox finished third in the American League (AL) with a record of 79 wins and 75 losses, 13 games behind the AL and World Series champion New York Yankees.  It would be the last time the Red Sox finished a season above .500, until their "Impossible Dream" season of 1967.

Offseason 
 January 23, 1958: Norm Zauchin and Albie Pearson were traded by the Red Sox to the Washington Senators for Pete Runnels.
 January 29, 1958: Mickey Vernon was selected off waivers from the Red Sox by the Cleveland Indians.
 Prior to 1958 season: Galen Cisco was signed as an amateur free agent by the Red Sox.

Regular season

Season standings

Record vs. opponents

Opening day lineup

Roster

Player stats

Batting

Starters by position 
Note: Pos = Position; G = Games played; AB = At bats; H = Hits; Avg. = Batting average; HR = Home runs; RBI = Runs batted in

Other batters 
Note: G = Games played; AB = At bats; H = Hits; Avg. = Batting average; HR = Home runs; RBI = Runs batted in

Pitching

Starting pitchers 
Note: G = Games pitched; IP = Innings pitched; W = Wins; L = Losses; ERA = Earned run average; SO = Strikeouts

Other pitchers 
Note: G = Games pitched; IP = Innings pitched; W = Wins; L = Losses; ERA = Earned run average; SO = Strikeouts

Relief pitchers 
Note: G = Games pitched; W = Wins; L = Losses; SV = Saves; ERA = Earned run average; SO = Strikeouts

Awards and honors 
 Jackie Jensen, American League MVP
 Jimmy Piersall, Gold Glove Award (OF)

Farm system 

LEAGUE CHAMPIONS: Minneapolis, Waterloo

Source:

References

External links
1958 Boston Red Sox team page at Baseball Reference
1958 Boston Red Sox season at baseball-almanac.com

Boston Red Sox seasons
Boston Red Sox
Boston Red Sox
1950s in Boston